Hugh de Stanford (fl. 1399–1422) was an English politician.

Life
Stanford's wife was named Joyce. They lived at Hextells, and he may have been related to Richard Stanford, MP for nearby Stafford.

Career
He is recorded as a lawyer in 1398, and then worked for the Stafford family. Stanford was Member of Parliament for Bridgnorth in 1411 and May 1413. He was MP for Newcastle-under-Lyme in 1420, December 1421, 1422 and 1423.

References

Year of birth missing
Year of death missing
14th-century births
15th-century deaths
14th-century English people
English MPs 1411
English lawyers
14th-century English lawyers
15th-century English lawyers
People from Stafford
English MPs May 1413
English MPs 1420
English MPs December 1421
English MPs 1422
English MPs 1423
Members of the Parliament of England for Newcastle-under-Lyme